Lantz Corners is an unincorporated community in Hamlin Township in McKean County, Pennsylvania, United States. Lantz Corners is located at the intersection of U.S. Route 6 and U.S. Route 219 to the southwest of Mount Jewett.

References

Unincorporated communities in McKean County, Pennsylvania
Unincorporated communities in Pennsylvania